Terry Neill may refer to:

 Terry Neill (1942–2022), Northern Ireland football player and manager
 Terry Neill (racehorse owner), British racehorse owner and Liverpool FC shareholder
 Terry Neill (Accenture chairman), former chairman of Andersen Worldwide (now Accenture)